USS Maple, was a lighthouse tender that served in the United States Navy from 1893 to 1899, seeing service as an auxiliary ship during the Spanish–American War in 1898, and from 1917 to 1919, operating as a patrol vessel during World War I. She also served as USLHT Maple in the United States Lighthouse Board fleet from 1899 to 1910 and in the United States Lighthouse Service from 1910 to 1933.

Construction and acquisition
USLHT Maple was built as a lighthouse tender in 1893 at Elizabethport, New Jersey. She was delivered to the United States Lighthouse Board on 26 May 1893. The Lighthouse Board transferred her to the United States Navy immediately upon delivery.

Service history

U.S. Navy, 1893–1899

The U.S. Navy commissioned the ship as USS Maple in June 1893. When the Spanish–American War broke out in April 1898, she was converted for war service at the Norfolk Navy Yard in Portsmouth, Virginia, her conversion including the installation of two quick-firing guns. After the completion of her conversion, she deployed to the Caribbean, where she operated with the U.S. Navy forces blockading Cuba. The war ended in August 1898, but Maple remained off Cuba until 20 September 1898. The Navy cited Maple for "conspicuous service" during the war.

After the war Maple underwent repairs. The Navy transferred her to the U.S. Lighthouse Board on 6 February 1899.

Lighthouse Board and Lighthouse Service, 1899–1917
Once again USLHT Maple, the ship was assigned to lighthouse tender duty in the 5th Lighthouse District, with her home port at Baltimore, Maryland. In 1901, her Scotch marine boilers were replaced. While leaving the Old Point Dock at Norfolk, Virginia, on 20 June 1907 she struck the steamer  on the port bow, doing US$500 in damage to Augusta . In 1910, the Lighthouse Board was abolished and replaced by the new United States Lighthouse Service, and Maple became part of the Lighthouse Service fleet.

U.S. Navy, 1917–1919
The United States entered World War I on 6 April 1917, and on 11 April 1917, the Lighthouse Service transferred Maple to the U.S. Navy for war service. After Maple underwent conversion for naval service as a patrol vessel, the Navy commissioned her as USS Maple on 1 November 1918. Assigned to the 5th Naval District, Maple performed patrol duties off Norfolk, Virginia, through the end of the war on 11 November 1918 and in the war′s aftermath until 1 July 1919, when the Navy both decommissioned her and transferred her back to the U.S. Lighthouse Service.

Lighthouse Service and commercial use, 1919–1949
As USLHT Maple, the ship returned to lighthouse tender service for the Lighthouse Service. She continued these duties until she was decommissioned in 1933. She was sold into commercial service on 29 October 1933.

The ship′s engines were removed before the end of 1933, and she was converted into the commercial barge Nichols No. 6. Later she was sold to the McLain Caroline Line, Inc., of New York City, which renamed her McLain No. 300. McClain No. 300 was retired from service in 1948 and scrapped in 1949.

References
 
 

 

Ships of the United States Lighthouse Service
Lighthouse tenders of the United States
Spanish–American War ships of the United States
World War I patrol vessels of the United States
Auxiliary ships of the United States Navy
1893 ships
Ships built in Elizabeth, New Jersey
Maritime incidents in 1907